Strickland may refer to:

Name
 Strickland (surname)

Places

Australia
 Strickland, Tasmania, a locality

Canada
 Fauquier-Strickland, Ontario
 Mount Strickland, Yukon

Papua New Guinea
 Strickland River, Western Province

United Kingdom
Places in Cumbria, England:
 Strickland Ketel
 Strickland Roger
 Great Strickland
 Little Strickland

United States
 Strickland, Wisconsin, a town
 Strickland (community), Wisconsin, an unincorporated community within Strickland, Wisconsin

Court cases
 Strickland v Rocla Concrete Pipes Ltd, a 1971 High Court of Australia case
 Strickland v. Sony, a 2005 case in Alabama
 Strickland v. Washington, a 1984 US Supreme Court case

Other uses
 Strickland Propane, a fictional business run by Buck Strickland in the television series King of the Hill
 Strickland's Frozen Custard, a frozen treats franchise based in Akron, Ohio
 USS Strickland (DE-333), a US Navy destroyer escort, in service 1944–1960

See also
 Strickland House (disambiguation)